Ptáček (feminine Ptáčková) is a Czech surname (meaning "little bird"), it may refer to:
 Adam Ptáček (born 1980), Czech pole vaulter
 Dana Ptáčková, Czech basketball player
 Fátima Ptacek (born 2000), American child actor and model
 František Ptáček, Czech professional ice hockey player
 Hynek Ptáček of Pirkstein (1404–1444), Czech nobleman
 Joe Ptacek, vocalist
 Kathryn Ptacek (born 1952, Omaha, Nebraska), American author and editor
 Rainer Ptacek (1951–1997), American Tucson-based guitarist and singer-songwriter
 Robert "Bob" Ptacek, professional American and Canadian football quarterback
 Vladimír Ptáček, Czech basketball player

See also 
 Pták
 Ptak
 Ptaki (disambiguation)
 Ptakowice

Czech-language surnames
Slavic-language female forms of surnames